Zosterornis is a genus of passerine birds in the white-eye family Zosteropidae.
The five species in the genus are endemic to the Philippines.

Taxonomy
The genus Zosterornis was introduced in 1894 by the Scottish ornithologist William Robert Ogilvie-Grant to accommodate his newly described species, the chestnut-faced babbler, which thus becomes the type species. The name combines the Ancient Greek zōstēr meaning "belt" with ornis meaning "bird".

These species were formerly included in the genus Stachyris in the Old World babblers family Timaliidae. They were moved to their own genus Zosterornis in the white-eye family Zosteropidae based on molecular phylogenetic studies published in the first decade of the 21st century.

The genus contains the following five species:
 Chestnut-faced babbler, Zosterornis whiteheadi
 Luzon striped babbler, Zosterornis striatus
 Panay striped babbler, Zosterornis latistriatus
 Negros striped babbler, Zosterornis nigrorum
 Palawan striped babbler, Zosterornis hypogrammicus

References

 
Bird genera
Zosteropidae

Taxa named by William Robert Ogilvie-Grant